Fellini Days is Fish's seventh solo studio album since leaving Marillion in 1988, his first since Raingods with Zippos (1999) and the first on his own label Chocolate Frog Records.

"Having long ago cast into exile the ghosts of prog rock, Fish ushers guitars and female singers to the fore," observed Classic Rock, "and blends his trademark poetry into the spacious but claustrophobic, almost Waitsian '3D', the blues rock weight of 'Long Cold Day' and the gathering dramas of 'Tiki 4', 'The Pilgrim's Address' and the slowly creeping 'Clock Moves Sideways'."

Track listing
"3D" (Dick/Wesley/Young) – 9.11
"So Fellini" (Dick/Wesley) – 4.06
"Tiki 4" (Dick/Wesley/Young) – 7.32
"Our Smile" (Dick/Wesley/Young) – 5.25
"Long Cold Day" (Dick/Wesley/Young) – 5.33
"Dancing in Fog" (Dick/Wesley/Young) – 5.30
"Obligatory Ballad" (Dick/Wesley) – 5.15
"The Pilgrim's Address" (Dick/Wesley) – 7.18
"Clock Moves Sideways" (Dick/Wesley) – 7.17

Bonus "Companion Disc"
"3D" (live in Rotterdam 10/5/01)
"So Fellini" (live in Poznan 31/05/01)
"Tiki 4" (live in Oslo 18/05/01)
"Pilgrim's Address" (live in Oslo 18/05/01)
"Clock Moves Sideways" (live in Oslo 18/05/01)
"Dancing In Fog" (History Of Guns remix)
"Obligatory Ballad" (Spaced Out remix)
"Clock Moves Sideways" (Two Clocks in One Whole remix)
"Our Smile" (Acoustic Version)

Credits (directly from sleeve notes)
Recorded at The Studio, Haddington, East Lothian, Scotland with additional recordings taken from sessions at The Grand Hotel, Pristina, Kosovo and live recordings from Leeuwarden, Utrecht and Oberhausen.
Recorded, engineered and produced by Elliot Ness.
Mixed by Calum Malcolm and Elliot Ness.
Mastered by Calum Malcolm.

Lead vocals: Fish
Guitars: John Wesley
Keyboards: John Young
Bass: Steve Vantsis
Drums: Dave Stewart
Backing Vocals: Susie Webb and Zoe Nicholas
Percussion: Dave Haswell

Bonus disc credits:
Engineered, recorded, mixed and produced by Elliot Ness.
Mastered by Dallas Simpson at Serendipity.

Drums: John Marter (1-5)
Bass: Steve Barnacle (1-5)
Keyboards: John Young (1/4/5/6)
Jim Heyden (2)
Max Rael (6/7/8)
Vocals: Fish
B-Vocals: Susie Webb and Zoe Nicholas (3/5/9)
Programming: Max Rael (6/7/8)
Loops: Courtesy of Amg (6/7/8)
Guitars: John Wesley.

References

2001 albums
Fish (singer) albums
Federico Fellini
Snapper Music albums